KLYK (94.5 FM) is a radio station broadcasting an Adult Top 40 format. Licensed to Kelso, Washington, United States, the station is currently owned by Bicoastal Media Licenses IV, LLC and features programming from Premiere Networks and Westwood One. The station focuses on Today's Best Music with the slogan "Southwest Washington's Hit Music Channel."

Programming
Monday-Friday

1-6 AM: Kendall

6-10 AM: Bernie Mack

10 AM-3 PM: Venetia

3-8 PM: Chuck D

8 PM-1 AM: Charlee

Saturday

Sunday

12-4 PM: AT40 with Ryan Seacrest

References

External links

LYK
Hot adult contemporary radio stations in the United States
Cowlitz County, Washington
1991 establishments in Washington (state)
Radio stations established in 1991